This page is about the concept in mathematical logic. For the concepts in sociology, see Institutional theory and Institutional logic.

In mathematical logic, institutional model theory generalizes a large portion of first-order model theory to an arbitrary logical system.

Overview 
The notion of "logical system" here is formalized as an institution. Institutions constitute a model-oriented meta-theory on logical systems similar to how the theory of rings and modules constitute a meta-theory for classical linear algebra. Another analogy can be made with universal algebra versus groups, rings, modules etc. By abstracting away from the realities of the actual conventional logics, it can be noticed that institution theory comes in fact closer to the realities of non-conventional logics.

Institutional model theory analyzes and generalizes classical model-theoretic notions and results, like

 elementary diagrams
 elementary embeddings
 ultraproducts, Los' theorem
 saturated models
 axiomatizability
 varieties, Birkhoff axiomatizability
 Craig interpolation
 Robinson consistency
 Beth definability
 Gödel's completeness theorem

For each concept and theorem, the infrastructure and properties required are analyzed and formulated as conditions on institutions, thus providing a detailed insight to which properties of first-order logic they rely on and how much they can be generalized to other logics.

References
 Răzvan Diaconescu: Institution-Independent Model Theory. Birkhäuser, 2008. .
 Răzvan Diaconescu: Jewels of Institution-Independent Model Theory. In: K. Futatsugi, J.-P. Jouannaud, J. Meseguer (eds.): Algebra, Meaning and Computation. Essays Dedicated to Joseph A. Goguen on the Occasion of His 65th Birthday. Lecture Notes in Computer Science 4060, p. 65-98, Springer-Verlag, 2006.
 Marius Petria and Rãzvan Diaconescu: Abstract Beth definability in institutions. Journal of Symbolic Logic 71(3), p. 1002-1028, 2006. 
 Daniel Gǎinǎ and Andrei Popescu: An institution-independent generalisation of Tarski's elementary chain theorem, Journal of Logic and Computation 16(6), p. 713-735, 2006.
 Till Mossakowski, Joseph Goguen, Rãzvan Diaconescu, Andrzej Tarlecki: What is a Logic?. In Jean-Yves Beziau, editor, Logica Universalis, pages 113-133. Birkhauser, 2005.
 Andrzej Tarlecki: Quasi-varieties in abstract algebraic institutions. Journal of Computer and System Sciences 33(3), p. 333-360, 1986.

External links
 Răzvan Diaconescu's publication list - contains recent work on institutional model theory

Mathematical logic
Model theory
Theoretical computer science